Calothamnus quadrifidus subsp. seminudus is a plant in the myrtle family, Myrtaceae and is endemic to the south-west of Western Australia.  It is similar to other subspecies of Calothamnus quadrifidus except that its leaves are linear and somewhat rough and scaly and the stamen bundles are relatively long.

Description
Its leaves are crowded, flat and linear or very narrow egg-shaped with the narrower end towards the base.

The flowers are red and arranged in clusters, usually on one side of the stem amongst the older leaves. The lower half of the outer surface of the floral cup (the hypanthium) is hairy while the upper part is glabrous. (Subspecies seminudus is similar to petraeus but has smaller fruit.)

Taxonomy and naming
Calothamnus quadrifidus subsp. seminudus was first formally described in 2010 by Alex George in Nuytsia from a specimen collected near Digger Rocks, north of Lake King. The epithet seminudus is "from the Latin semi- (half) and nudus (bare), in reference to the hypanthium which is glabrous in the upper half to two-thirds".

Distribution and habitat
Calothamnus quadrifidus subsp. seminudus occurs in the Ironcaps, Bremer Range and Peak Charles areas in the Avon Wheatbelt, Coolgardie and Mallee biogeographic regions. It grows in sand derived from laterite in mallee shrubland.

Conservation
Calothamnus quadrifidus subsp. seminudus is classified as "not threatened" by the Western Australian Government Department of Parks and Wildlife.

References

quadrifidus
Myrtales of Australia
Plants described in 2010
Plant subspecies